is the 20th studio album by Japanese entertainer Miho Nakayama. Released through King Records on June 10, 1998, it is Nakayama's sixth studio release (after One and Only, Mind Game, Merry Merry, Dé eaya, and Wagamama na Actress) to not feature a single.

The album peaked at No. 9 on Oricon's albums chart and sold over 34,000 copies.

Track listing

Charts

References

External links
 
 
 

1998 albums
Miho Nakayama albums
Japanese-language albums
King Records (Japan) albums